DO-232 is an air traffic control software standard published by RTCA, Incorporated.

Flight Information Services (FIS) is defined as the non-control information needed by pilots to operate in the US National Airspace System (NAS) and internationally.  The timely, efficient exchange of FIS data is required for safety, efficiency and utility in aircraft operations.  Pilots, flight planners (e.g., pilots, dispatchers, schedulers), and controllers all need accurate, timely FIS data to plan (or re-plan) and assess the execution of flight operations.

Outline of contents
Introduction
FIS Data Link - Concepts and Needs
FIS Data Link in the FANS CNS/ATM Environment
System Architecture and Implementation Considerations
Current FIS Data Link Products and Plans
Summary and Recommendations
Appendix A: The National Aviation Weather Users Forum
Appendix B: Operational Descriptions of Initial FIS Request/Reply Data Link Products
Appendix C: Additional Details of Some of the Various Candidate Airborne Data Link Channels
Appendix D: Analysis Criteria - SAMA Preliminary Study

See also
Air traffic control
ACARS
Flight Information and Control of Operations

RTCA standards
Air traffic control